This is a list of countries and territories by land and maritime borders. For each country or territory, the number and identity of other countries and territories that neighbor it are listed. Land borders and maritime boundaries are included and are tabulated separately and in combination. For purposes of this list, "maritime boundary" includes boundaries that are recognized by the United Nations Convention on the Law of the Sea, which includes boundaries of territorial waters, contiguous zones, and exclusive economic zones. However, it does not include lake or river boundaries, which are considered land boundaries.

Also included is the number of unique sovereign states that a country or territory shares as neighbors. If the number is higher due to multiple dependencies or unrecognized states bordering the state, the larger number is shown in brackets.

Footnotes are provided to provide clarity regarding the status of certain countries and territories.

List

See also
 List of political and geographic borders
 List of countries and territories by land borders
 List of countries and territories by maritime boundaries
 List of maritime boundary treaties
 List of territorial disputes
 Landlocked country

Notes

References

Further reading
 Anderson, Ewan W. (2003). International Boundaries: A Geopolitical Atlas. Routledge: New York. ;  OCLC 54061586
 Charney, Jonathan I., David A. Colson, Robert W. Smith. (2005). International Maritime Boundaries. Hotei Publishing: Leiden.	; ; ; ; ;  OCLC 23254092
 Jagota, S. P. (1985). Maritime Boundary. Martinis Nijhoff: Dordrecht. ; ;  OCLC 	1175640
 Prescott, John Robert Victor. (1985). The Maritime Political Boundaries of the World. London: Methuen. ;  OCLC 12582178

Countries and territories by land and maritime borders

Borders